This is a list of electoral results for the electoral district of Ballarat South in Victorian state elections.

Members for Ballarat South

Election results

Elections in the 1980s

Elections in the 1970s

Elections in the 1960s

Elections in the 1950s

References

Victoria (Australia) state electoral results by district